Jayawijaya Dirgantara is an airline based in Jakarta, Indonesia. It operates domestic / regional cargo flights in the territory of the province of Papua. Its main base is at Halim Perdanakusuma Airport.

History
Jayawijaya Dirgantara established in 2012, and began operations in 2013 and based in Jakarta. Initially the airline was only a Boeing 737-200 aircraft with PK-JRB registration. This airline serves the transportation of goods and cargo from Jayapura to Wamena, Papua, Indonesia.

On 18 August 2018, Garuda Indonesia signed an MoU agreement with this airline relating to the distribution of cargo from Jayapura to Wamena.

Destinations
Jayawijaya Dirgantara operates  freighter services with a focus on East Indonesia destinations, providing transportation linkages in East Indonesia. Scheduled destinations include:

Indonesia
Jayapura - Sentani International Airport (DJJ)
Wamena - Wamena Airport (WMX)

Fleet
, the Jayawijaya Dirgantara fleet consists of the following aircraft:

Historic fleet
 2 Boeing 737-200
 1 Fokker 27

Accidents and incidents
 May 25, 2018 - A Boeing 737 -200 cargo aircraft operated by Jayawijaya Dirgantara Air with PK-JRM registration, slipped while landing at Wamena Airport, Papua, Indonesia. As a result, part of engine number 2 is broken and thrown on the runway. The cargo plane carrying rice and cement had an accident while landing on runway 15. There were no fatalities in the incident. The aircraft involved was removed from the airline's fleet.

References

Airlines of Indonesia